Siltanen is a Finnish surname. Notable people with the surname include:

Risto Siltanen (born 1958), Finnish ice hockey player
Sylvi Siltanen (1909–1986), Finnish accountant and politician

See also
Siltanen & Partners, an American advertising agency

Finnish-language surnames